The Young Communist League of Persia was a communist youth organization in Persia. The organization was founded in the midst of the Gilan Revolution. It was set up following the July 31, 1920 split between the communist and non-communist Jangali elements. The YCL of Persia conducted agitation and propaganda activities and organized armed actions against the followers of Kuchik Khan. The organization was crushed after the defeat of the Gilan Socialist Soviet Republic.

In 1927 different communist youth groups merged, recreating the YCL of Persia. It was a section of the Young Communist International. In the fall of 1928, the organization was suppressed along with other left groups.

References

1920 establishments in Iran
Youth wings of political parties in Iran
Youth wings of communist parties